Aesop's Fables, II is a 2005 steel sculpture by Mark Di Suvero, installed on the Massachusetts Institute of Technology (MIT) campus, in Cambridge, Massachusetts, United States.

References

External links
 
 Aesop's Fables, II, 2005 at cultureNOW

2005 sculptures
Massachusetts Institute of Technology campus
Outdoor sculptures in Massachusetts
Steel sculptures in Massachusetts